Pommerit-le-Vicomte is a commune in the Côtes-d'Armor department of Brittany in northwestern France.

International relations
The town is twinned with Millstreet, Co. Cork, Ireland.

Population

Inhabitants of Pommerit-le-Vicomte are called pommeritains in French.

See also
Communes of the Côtes-d'Armor department

References

External links

Official website 

Communes of Côtes-d'Armor